Drug Fair was a chain of drugstores based in New Jersey.

History
The company kept its headquarters in Somerset, New Jersey and was founded in 1954. In addition to its drugstore chain Drug Fair also owned and operated Cost Cutters, a discount drug and general merchandise chain. In the 2000s, Drug Fair introduced a discount card called "We Care," which was the company's slogan. The card was good at any Drug Fair or Cost Cutters store as both store's logos were printed on the cards.

In 2005, Drug Fair was acquired by Sun Capital Partners, a private equity firm.

By mid-2008 Drug Fair operated 50 locations and Cost Cutters, had another eleven locations.

In March 2009, two Drug Fair locations in Raritan and Rockaway, New Jersey closed abruptly. Shortly after the two stores closed, Drug Fair announced it was filing for Chapter 11 bankruptcy protection. Just prior to the filing for bankruptcy, Drug Fair announced it was selling thirty-two drugstores to Walgreens, who also purchased prescription lists from several other Drug Fair locations. After the purchase, Drug Fair announced that their stores in Bridgewater, North Arlington, and East Rutherford, New Jersey would be quickly liquidated and closed along with one of their two locations in Clifton, New Jersey. Shortly thereafter, another ten Drug Fair locations and nine Cost Cutters stores were marked for closure. These stores began liquidating immediately afterward and were shuttered in May 2009; many of the stores' leases were purchased by Dollar General and reopened under that banner.

On May 16, 2009, the sale was finalized and the Drug Fair stores still in the chain became Walgreens.

Private investment company Oak Point Partners acquired the remnant assets, consisting of any known and unknown assets that weren't previously administered, from the Drug Fair Group, Inc., et al., Bankruptcy Estates on March 18, 2013.

Original Drug Fair locations
 Easton, Maryland
 Manassas Park, Virginia
 Plainfield, New Jersey
 Westfield, New Jersey
 Hillside, New Jersey

References

1954 establishments in New Jersey
2009 disestablishments in New Jersey
Companies based in Somerset County, New Jersey
Retail companies established in 1954
Retail companies disestablished in 2009
Companies that filed for Chapter 11 bankruptcy in 2009
Defunct companies based in New Jersey
Defunct discount stores based in New Jersey
Defunct pharmacies of the United States
Health care companies based in New Jersey
Franklin Township, Somerset County, New Jersey
American companies established in 1954
Walgreens Boots Alliance